Juan García (born 12 April 1934) is a Spanish former sports shooter. He competed at the 1964 Summer Olympics and the 1968 Summer Olympics.

References

1934 births
Living people
Spanish male sport shooters
Olympic shooters of Spain
Shooters at the 1964 Summer Olympics
Shooters at the 1968 Summer Olympics
Sportspeople from Madrid
20th-century Spanish people